Verticosta  is a genus of sea snails, marine gastropod mollusks, in the family Capulidae.

Species
Species within the genus Verticosta  include:
 Verticosta campanella S.-I Huang & M.-H. Lin, 2020
 Verticosta crassicostata (Melvill, 1912)
 Verticosta lanterna S.-I Huang & M.-H. Lin, 2020
 Verticosta migrans (Dall, 1881)
  Verticosta robusta S.-I Huang & M.-H. Lin, 2020

References

Capulidae